Hesperanoplium antennatum is a species of beetle in the family Cerambycidae. It was described by Linsley in 1932.

References

Hesperophanini
Beetles described in 1932